"Livin' My Love" is a song by American DJ and producer Steve Aoki from his debut studio album Wonderland. It was released as a single on January 10, 2012. The song features vocals by American electro-hop duo LMFAO and Australian singer-songwriter duo NERVO.

Track listing

Credits and personnel
Vocals – Skyler Gordy, Stefan Gordy, Miriam Nervo, Olivia Nervo
Musician – Steve Aoki, Justin Bates
Lyrics – Sky Ferreira, Cory Nitta, Jon Szymanski
Label: Dim Mak Records

Charts

References

2012 singles
2012 songs
Steve Aoki songs
LMFAO songs
Nervo (DJs) songs
Songs written by Sky Ferreira
Songs written by Olivia Nervo
Songs written by Miriam Nervo
Songs written by Redfoo
Songs written by Sky Blu (rapper)
Songs written by Steve Aoki